Cordonnier is a French-language occupational surname literally meaning "shoemaker" (or, less accurately, "cobbler"). From Old Fr.
cordouanier (cordonnier), a cordwainer, a worker in Cuir de Cordoue ("Cordovan leather"), literally meaning "leather from Córdoba"

The surname may refer to:
Alphonse-Amédée Cordonnier (1848–1930), French sculptor
Antoine Cordonnier (1892–1918), French fighter pilot
Eugène Cordonnier (1892–1967), French gymnast
Julien Cordonnier (born 1980), French footballer
Louis Marie Cordonnier (1854–1940), French architect
Victor Cordonnier (1858–1936), French Army general

See also
Mount Cordonnier

References

French-language surnames
Occupational surnames